Rockford Speedway is a 1/4 mile short track high banked asphalt oval located in Loves Park, Illinois on Illinois Route 173. Rockford Speedway, Chicagoland Speedway, and World Wide Technology Raceway at Gateway are the only racetracks running under NASCAR sanctions in Illinois.

It hosts weekly local-level events during the summer racing season as well as occasional regional- and national-level events. Notable special events at the track include trailer races, endurance races, the Spring Classic, ALl-Star 100, Bahama Bracket Nationals, and the National Short Track Championship.

History
The track was built in 1947 by a Stanley Ralston and 6 other investors. Hugh Deery eventually bought into the speedway and was the sole owner by 1966. It was run by his widow, Jody Deery until her death in 2022, at which time David Deery took over management of the track. It opened in 1948 as a midget car racing venue. Despite a death in the pits at the speedway several weeks after opening, on June 16, 1948, the track continued operation. Rockford Speedway is known for being the first track to develop an economical late model program as well as being an early adopter of the short track Saturday night racing program. Another one of Hugh Deery's innovations was to host a season-ending special event (which he titled the National Short Track Championship). He was inducted in the Illinois Stock Car Hall of Fame in 2013. Jody Deery is one of a handful of track operators on the 22-person nominating committee for the NASCAR Hall of Fame.

Over the years the track has also hosted concerts. On August 17, 1980, as a part of 'Rockford Speedway Jam 1980', Black Sabbath performed at the speedway as a part of their Heaven & Hell Tour.

2023 will be the last season of racing at Rockford Speedway, as the property has been sold and will be redeveloped.

Track
The track is an asphalt-paved nominal 1/4 mile. It is highly banked at the turns and relatively flat on the front and back stretches. It is banked at 22 degrees in the -wide corners and eight degrees in the -wide straightaways. Inside the 1/4 mile oval track is a figure eight track.

Programs

Weekly programs

The tracks offer two weekly programs during much of the season. On Saturdays it hosts a NASCAR-sanctioned Whelen All-American Series late model race, along with All American Sportsmen, American Short Trackers and Road Runners. On Wednesday nights it hosts The Road Runner Super Summer Series, Bandits, Winged Women on wheels, Figure 8's, Legends, Minicups, Bandoleros, and spectacular drags.

Notable racers and participants
Track champions include seven-time champions  Bobby Wilberg (1991, 1995 - 2000) and John Knaus, with Joe Shear, Sr, (1967-1972) winning six titles.  Both Knaus' son Chad and Shear's son Joe Jr. are NASCAR national series championship winning crew chiefs.  Travis Kvapil started racing at Rockford at age 16 and was the 1994 track champion in the American Short Tracker division. Rich Bickle was the track's sportsman rookie of the year in 1980.

Several notable people started their racing careers at Rockford. NASCAR crew chief Chad Knaus was his father's crew chief for his championship race car. NASCAR Sprint Cup Series official John Darby got his start at Rockford in 1971 as an owner of a street stock. In 1976 he became crew chief for a late model that he owned which won the 1977 championship. He stopped owning the racecar in 1982 and became a track official. He moved up the NASCAR ranks as a technical official, and by 1994 he was the director for the NASCAR Busch Series (now Xfinity Series). After three years he was named the NASCAR's Sprint Cup Series director of competition.

Special events
Rockford Speedway hosted two ARCA Racing Series events between 1987 and 1988.

The track holds events in the ARCA Midwest Tour Series, Must-See Xtemem Sprint Car Series, Mid American Stock Car Series events, Big 8 Limited Late Model Touring Series, Midwest Dash 4 cylinder touring series, monster trucks, and enduros. Series that held races at the track include: NASCAR Midwest Series, the Wisconsin Challenge Series, ASA Late Model Series Northern Division, and USAC National Midgets.

In 2016 the speedway hosted the World of Outlaws sprint cars and late models in an event called the Outlaw Clay Classic. The track was covered in clay for the first time in the track's history for two nights and racing was held on the track's temporary surface.

National Short Track Championship

The track holds its annual National Short Track Championship (NSTC) the weekend closest to October 1. The three day event usually has 12 divisions racing. Track promoters decided to host the first 200 lap event in late 1966 to pit the best drivers in Chicagoland against the best drivers in the Central Wisconsin Drivers Association. Drivers competing at the event are primarily from Illinois and Wisconsin, although drivers from other states often participate. The event was sanctioned by ARTGO for several years, and it became part of the CRA Super Series tour in 2004. In 2005, it was part of the ASA Late Model Series. It was not part of any tour for several years until the ASA Midwest Tour took over in 2011. As of 2012, there was no sanctioning body for the Super Late Models running at the event.

Winners
Joe Shear was the first driver to win eight NSTCs and Steve Carlson tied his record in 2011. Other multiple winners include Jeremy Lepak, Dick Trickle, and Eddie Hoffman.

The first event was won by Wisconsin short track racer Trickle by a lap over Chicagoland stock-car champion Roy Martinelli. Trickle was billed as the winningest short track driver in history with estimates of his win total between 1,000 and 1,200 races. Years later, Trickle commented, "I really do treasure that one in 1966. There were a lot of behind-the-scenes things that went on there. Number one, I had never run outside my own backyard, you might say, which is the central Wisconsin area. I never ran somewhere except in my own little circuit, but I had won there. The first time I ever stepped out of the central Wisconsin area was to the Rockford Nationals in 1966."

Images

References

External links

Official track website
Page at nascar.com
Rockford Speedway race results at Racing-Reference

Buildings and structures in Winnebago County, Illinois
Motorsport venues in Illinois
NASCAR tracks
ARCA Menards Series tracks
Tourist attractions in Winnebago County, Illinois